Svetlana Gincheva (born 5 January 1956) is a Bulgarian rower. She competed in the women's quadruple sculls event at the 1976 Summer Olympics.

References

External links
 

1956 births
Living people
Bulgarian female rowers
Olympic rowers of Bulgaria
Rowers at the 1976 Summer Olympics
Place of birth missing (living people)